Ralph Lombreglia (born 1951) is an American short story writer and multimedia producer and consultant. He wrote several short stories including two collections: Men Under Water and Make Me Work.  He was a 1998 recipient of the Whiting Award. He teaches at the Massachusetts Institute of Technology.

Bibliography

Short fiction 
Collections

Book reviews

External links
 Lombreglia's Writings for The Atlantic Monthly, 1993-2001
 Southern Literary Festival interview, April 2000
 The Turnaround Is At Hand, Short Story, July 2007
 American Scholar, Unrippable, Short Story 2009
 American Scholar, Mountain People, Short Story 2011
Profile at The Whiting Foundation

1951 births
Living people
American short story writers
The Atlantic (magazine) people